In India, a Chartered Accountant is a qualified accountant of Institute of Chartered Accountants of India. The person clears the Institute conducted examination  with prescribed percentage and also completes the required theory and practical trainings conducted by the Institute before being eligible as a  registered member with it. As a qualified professional, he can perform the tasks enlisted by the Institute for various organisations to ensure proper accounting, auditing and taxation controls to be followed by them in the running of their business and operations. These policies clears any ambiguities for the organisations in the maintenance of their books of accounts.

History and Objective 

A Chartered Accountant in India is a person who has qualified the examinations and completed the required practical and theoretical sessions conducted by Institute of Chartered Accountants of India, which was formed as body of registered accountants in 1949. The person is required have sound knowledge in the subject of Accounting, Auditing, Costing and various aspects of Direct and Indirect Taxation.

Education 

Following are the required educational qualifications:

An aspirant can enroll for Chartered Accountant either after completion of 12th or Graduation or Post Graduation.

An aspirant needs to enroll for practical training for 3 years for Articleship with a registered Chartered Accountant after passing Intermediate exam either in both groups or either of them.

He should clear 8 subjects in Intermediate exam during in 3 years for being eligible to appear in examination for CA Final. 

After clearing the Intermediate exam, he can appear for final exam during the practical training in last six months under a professional Chartered Accountant.

After successful completion of CA Final course he is required to attend the four-week mandatory training forAdvanced ICITSS. The registration certificate has 5 years validity.

Eligibility after 12th 

1. Eligibility for foundation course is clearance of 12th board exam  from any of the recognised educational institution of University Grants Commission in any stream.

The aspirant should  enrol for the Common Proficiency Test (CPT) with ICAI, and after 60 days post registration time limit he will be eligible for writing exam.

The eligibility for the Orientation Programme and Information Technology Training (ITT), he should join Integrated Professional Competence Course (IPCC) for 9 months, post clearance of Common Proficiency Test (CPT). During the course time the aspirant is required to complete Orientation Programme for 35 hours and Information Technology Training for 100 hours.

The aspirant is required to pass both groups of IPCC post Integrated Professional Competence Course (IPCC) completion.

He can start Articleship, a 3 year practical training course with registered Chartered Accountant who is eligible to for the same after clearing Group 1 of Intermediate exam. However, other group can be cleared during the period of articleship or subsequently.

He can register for final course of Chartered Accountancy course after clearing both groups at Intermediate level. 

The aspirant can appear for both groups of Chartered Accountants Final course and get qualified after passing both groups with requisite percentage, during the last 6 months of Articleship.

The aspirant can complete articleship after qualifying in the Chartered Accountant Final Course if the schedule goes accordingly meeting all the eligibility criteria at different stages.

The aspirant is eligible to become a member of ICAI, on successful completion of all the necessary courses, required exams and mandatory training specified above.

The aspirant becomes an eligible person to be called as Chartered Accountant, only after he registers with ICAI and obtains membership.

Eligibility after Graduation 

An aspirant can appear for the IPCC exams directly after 9 months of registering himself and is also exempted from appearing for CPT, in case he is a graduate and has cleared the examination with mandatory percentage . He will have eligibility registration for the Final Course of CA and clear the same after passing the IPCC examination.

He will be eligible for ICAI membership, post completion of required examination, training and Articleship period.

He can start practicing as a Chartered Accountant only after getting membership post registering with ICAI.

Commerce Graduates 

A Commerce graduate can apply directly for CA Intermediate Course in case

a. Clears graduation with minimum 55 percentage marks.

b. Has good knowledge in subjects relating to Accountancy, Direct and Indirect Taxation, Subjects in Law including Mercantile and Corporate Law, Economics, Auditing, and other commerce related subjects.

Non Commerce Graduates 

A person who is a non commerce graduate can aspire for being a Chartered Accountant, if he has completed his graduation from an approved UGC-recognised educational institution with a pass percentage of 60 percentage or more.

He can appear directly for the IPCC exams post completion of 9 months of registration and is also exempted from CPT. He can register and clear CA Final exam, after completion of IPCC exam.

He will be eligible for ICAI membership, post completion of required examination, trainings and Articleship period.

He can start practicing as a Chartered Accountant only after getting membership post registering with ICAI.

Eligibility after Post-Graduation 

A post graduate can directly apply for CA Intermediate Course.

Post qualification of Intermediate Levels in ICSI or ICWA 

• Cleared Intermediate level examination from Institute of Company Secretaries of India or The Institute of Cost & Works Accountants of India (ICWA).

Responsibilities 

A Chartered Accountant in India performs following activities:

 Offers advice in financial planning.

 Planning budget and other financial system.

 Treasury and tax related advises.

 Performance of Annual financial audits.

 Assessing companies financial risk.

 Preparation of financial statements.

 Financial planning and forecasting.

 In case of any discrepancy, liaison with internal and external auditors.

Curriculum 

Following are the curriculum and eligibility for clearance of each of the stages:

Foundation Course 

Includes four subjects of 100 marks each and duration of exam being 3 hours each.

Paper 1 & 2 are subjective and Paper 3 & 4 are objective type. Objective papers does not carry negative marking for selecting wrong options.

Paper 1: Accounting principles and practices.

Paper 2: Business Law & Reporting and Business Correspondence 

Section A: Laws in Business (60 Marks)

Section B: Reporting and Business Correspondence (40 Marks)

Paper 3: Statistics & Logical Reasoning and Business Mathematics 

Part 1: Logical Reasoning and Business Mathematics  (60 Marks)

Part 2: Statistics (40 Marks)

Paper 4: Business and Commercial Knowledge and Business Economics

Part 1: Economics in Business (60 Marks)

Part 2: Commercial Knowledge and Business (40 Marks)

Qualifying Marks

Examination for Chartered Accountancy Foundation Level are conducted each year in May and November.

An aspirant needs to get 40 percent minimum in each subject and an aggregate of 50 percent in all subjects, to qualify in the foundation examination.

Intermediate Examination 

The Intermediate Exam consists of 4 papers each in two groups carrying 100 marks each with prescribed time limit of 3 hours during exam.

GROUP 1

Paper 1: Accountancy

Paper 2: Corporate Law and Allied Law

Part 1: Corporate Laws-60 marks

Part 2: Allied Laws-40 marks

Paper 3: Management and Cost Accounting

Paper 4: Income Tax and Indirect Tax

Part A: Income Tax-60 marks

Part B: Indirect Taxation-40 marks

GROUP 2

Paper 5: Advanced Accountancy

Paper 6: Audit and Assurance

Paper 7: Strategic Management and Enterprise Information System

Part A: Information System for Enterprise-50 marks

Part B: Strategic Management-50 marks

Paper 8: Economics for Finance and Financial Management

Part A: Financial Management-60 marks

Part B: Finance Economics -40 marks

Marks needed to Qualify

There is a 30 marks MCQ for tax, law, EIS SM, ECO, Audit, FM Eco.

Examination for Chartered Accountancy Intermediate Level are conducted each year in May and November.

A candidate can either opt to attempt for single or both groups in examination, however he can aim for All India Rank in the examination only if he attends and clears both groups at a time and is able to secure marks at top 50 candidates level attending from country.

An aspirant needs to get 40 percent minimum in each subject and an aggregate of 50 percent in all subjects, to qualify in the Intermediate examination. If a candidate appears for examination for both groups and if he is able to secure minimum qualified marks in all subjects in either groups or both groups but fails to get aggregate in any  group than the same can be set off from the excess marks from other group. However if still the marks are unable to meet the aggregate criteria in required group, than he is considered as fail for the group he is unable to secure the aggregate and needs to attend again.

Final Examination 

The Final exam in Chartered Accountancy has 8 papers of 100 marks each, which are divided into four subjects in two groups. The exam duration for each subject is 3 hours.

GROUP 1

Paper 1: Reporting in Financial

Paper 2: Financial and Strategic Management

Paper 3: Professional Ethics and Advanced Auditing

Paper 4: Economic Laws and Corporate Laws

Part 1:  Laws for Corporate-70 marks

Part 2: Laws in Economics-30 marks

GROUP 2

Paper 5: Performance Evaluation and Strategic Cost Management 

Paper 6: Open Book Exam or Elective Papers

Electives:

6A Management in Risk

6B Capital Markets & Financial Services

6C Taxation of International Income

6D Laws related to Economy

6E Reporting Standards in Global Finance

6F Case Study of Multi-disciplinary 

Paper 7: Laws in Direct Taxation & Taxation in International

Part I: Laws in Direct Tax -70 marks

Part II: Taxation in International - 30 marks

Paper 8: Laws in Indirect Tax 

Part A: Taxation of Goods & Services -75 marks

Part B: FTP & Customs -25 marks

Qualifying Marks

Examination for Chartered Accountancy Final Level are conducted each year in May and November.

A candidate can either opt to attempt for single or both groups in examination, however he can aim for All India Rank in the examination only if he attends and clears both groups at a time and is able to secure marks at top 50 candidates level attending from country.

An aspirant needs to get 40 percent minimum in each subject and an aggregate of 50 percent in all subjects, to qualify in the Final examination. If a candidate appears for examination for both groups and if he is able to secure minimum qualified marks in all subjects in either groups or both groups but fails to get aggregate in any group than the same can be set off from the excess marks from other group. However if still the marks are unable to meet the aggregate criteria in required group, than he is considered as fail for the group he is unable to secure the aggregate and needs to attend again.

Examination 

The Examination by ICAI at Foundation, Intermediate and Final levels are conducted two times in a year.

Examination Fee 

The examination fee for foundation course is Rs 1500. For both groups of Intermediate course the fee is Rs 2700, and for one group it is Rs 1500. For applying for Final group, exam fee is Rs 3300 for both groups and Rs 1800 for single group.

Recognition 

Chartered Accountants are eligible for courses to do Ph.D in universities based in India, National Eligibility Test (NET) conducted by UGC and the award of Fellowship in Junior Research or Assistant Professor as the degree holders of Chartered Accountancy (CA) course are considered equivalent to Post Graduates by the UGC.

Related Articles 

 Institute of Chartered Accountants of India.

References

External links 
 Official Website
 Chartered Accountant

Accountants
Accounting qualifications
Indian accountants